"Amen" is a song performed by an Australian Christian pop duo For King & Country. The song impacted Christian radio in the United States on 5 February 2021, becoming the fourth single from Burn the Ships (2018). The song was written by Matt Hales, Seth Mosley, Joel Smallbone and Luke Smallbone.

"Amen" peaked at No. 5 on the US Hot Christian Songs chart.

Background
"Amen" was initially released on 24 August 2018 as the fourth promotional single from their album, Burn the Ships (2018). Joel Smallbone shared the story behind the song, saying:

Composition
"Amen" is composed in the key of A minor with a tempo of 94 beats per minute.

Commercial performance
"Amen" debuted at number 25 on the US Hot Christian Songs chart dated September 8, 2018. The song went onto spend twelve non-consecutive weeks on the chart before dropping off. Prior to the official release of "Amen" on Christian radio, the song debuted on Christian Airplay dated 16 January 2021, at number 48. The song returned to the Hot Christian Songs the following week, registering at number 48. Billboard reported that "Amen" broke through the top ten of the Hot Christian Songs chart, entering at No. 9 on the May 1-dated chart, owing to substantial gains in radio airplay and streams.

Music video
The music video of "Amen" was published on For King & Country's YouTube channel on 5 October 2018. The music video was filmed in the Salt Flats of Utah, which Joel Smallbone said "is the flattest place on the earth," and "resonated with the dark and desolate life without great hope."

Performances
For King & Country did a pre-recorded performance of the song featuring Lecrae for the 51st GMA Dove Awards, aired on the Trinity Broadcasting Network on 30 October 2020.

Track listing

Charts

Weekly charts

Year-end charts

Release history

References

2021 singles
2018 songs
For King & Country (band) songs
Contemporary Christian songs
Songs written by Aqualung (musician)
Songs written by Seth Mosley
Songs written by Tedd T
Songs written by Joel Smallbone